Mshengu White Mambazo is a South African choral group consisting of the sons of Ladysmith Black Mambazo leader Joseph Shabalala, with his eldest son Nkosinathi leading the group. They sing in the traditional style of isicathamiya, like their parents in the above group. Formed in 1976 by Joseph and his late wife Nellie, the group came to local prominence in 1987, when they recorded a full album that October.

The group changed its name to Ladysmith Black Mambazo Junior in 2000, as "foreign audiences were thinking about skin colour in the name 'White'," according to Joseph Shabalala.

Four members of the group–Thamsanqa, Sibongiseni, Thulani and Msizi Shabalala–left in 1993 to join Ladysmith Black Mambazo. Ever since then, the group has performed on a low scale but continually comes together at times in South Africa and in the US, where they performed in New York in early 2003. The group also calls itself the Junior Mambazo Singers.

Ladysmith Black Mambazo
A cappella musical groups
South African choirs
Musical groups established in 1976
1976 establishments in South Africa